"What You Waiting For?" is a Gwen Stefani song. It may also refer to:

 "What You Waiting For" (Jeon Somi song), 2020
 What You Waiting For, the debut album of Mizz Nina
 "What You Waiting For?", a song by Sigala from Brighter Days
 "What You Waiting For?", a song by Lily Allen from No Shame
 "What You Waiting For", a song by Robert Palmer from Pride
 "What You Waiting For", a song by a South Korean artist Anda

See also
 What Are You Waiting For? (disambiguation)